Alatanadata is a monotypic genus of moths in the family of Notodontidae. Its only species, Alatanadata latipennis, is found in Cameroon. Both the genus and species were first described by Embrik Strand in 1912.

References

Strand, E. (1915). "Einige exotische, insbesondere afrikanische Heterocera". Archiv für Naturgeschichte. 81 (A)(2): 129–134.

Notodontidae
Monotypic moth genera